Miguel Santana Luna (born 18 November 1991 in Spain) is a Spanish footballer.

Career

After failing to make an appearance with Spanish La Liga side UD Las Palmas, Santana joined UD San Fernando in the fourth division.

In 2018, he signed for Swiss club Neuchâtel Xamax FCS. However, Santana soon sustained an injury in a friendly against an Arabian outfit. which kept him out for 5 months. Despite the president wanting him to leave, Santana managed to play 4 league games, helping the club avoid relegation from the top flight.

In 2020, at the age of 28, he signed for Saint-Blaise in the Swiss amateur leagues to help guide their young players as well as achieve promotion.

References

External links
Maikel Santana at Soccerway

Spanish footballers
Association football defenders
Neuchâtel Xamax FCS players
Living people
1991 births